Mpigi–Kabulasoke–Maddu–Sembabule Road is a road in the Central Region of Uganda, connecting the towns of Mpigi in Mpigi District to Gombe in Butambala District, Kabulasoke and Maddu in Gomba District and Sembabule in Sembabule District.

Location
The coordinates of the road near Kanoni are 0°10'26.0"N, 31°55'27.0"E (Latitude:0.173889; Longitude:31.924167).

Upgrading to bitumen
In October 2010, Uganda National Roads Authority, a parastatal, publicly announced that in 2011, it would begin upgrading  of 32 different national roads in the country, from unsealed gravel surface to class II bitumen. This road was one of the roads on that list.

The road was divided into two sections; (a) Mpigi–Kanoni Road  and (b) Kanoni–Sembabule Road . Work on both sections started in 2014, with expected completion in the second half of 2017. A related road, the Sembale–Villa Maria Road  is under the same contract and work on that road is expected to begin in September 2015, with completion expected in 2018. Finding is 100 percent provided by the Ugandan government.

See also
 Maddu
 List of roads in Uganda
 Economy of Uganda
 Transport in Uganda

References

External links
 Uganda National Road Authority Homepage

Roads in Uganda
Mpigi District
Butambala District
Gomba District
Sembabule District
Central Region, Uganda